Jean Desgranges (22 April 1929 – 10 March 1996) was a French footballer. He played in one match for the France national football team in 1953. He was also named in France's squad for the Group 4 qualification tournament for the 1954 FIFA World Cup.

References

1929 births
1996 deaths
French footballers
France international footballers
Place of birth missing
Association football midfielders